"I'll Still Love You More" is a song recorded by American country music artist Trisha Yearwood for her seventh studio album Where Your Road Leads (1998). It was written by Diane Warren, produced by Yearwood and Tony Brown, and released in April 1999 as the album's fourth single.  Aside from the album version, a pop remix also exists with slightly different vocals. The song reached number 10 on the US Billboard Hot Country Singles & Tracks chart, and number 65 on the US Billboard Hot 100.

Critical reception
Deborah Evans Price, of Billboard magazine reviewed the song favorably, saying that while it doesn't have the "dramatic feeling or sweeping cinematic power of 'How Do I Live'", it still an effective ballad. Price described Yearwood's performance as "beautiful and flawless."

Music video
The video was directed by Picture Vision.

Chart performance
"I'll Still Love You More" debuted at number 69 on the U.S. Billboard Hot Country Singles & Tracks for the week of May 8, 1999.

Charts

Weekly charts

Year-end charts

References

1999 singles
1999 songs
Trisha Yearwood songs
Songs written by Diane Warren
Song recordings produced by Tony Brown (record producer)
MCA Nashville Records singles